Ge Hu may refer to:

 Gehu or ge hu (革胡; pinyin: géhú), Chinese musical instrument
 Ge Lake or Ge Hu 
 ge-hu or tauge tahu, see Chinese Indonesian cuisine

Given name Ge surname Hu
Hu Ge (actor) (胡歌, born 1982), Chinese actor and singer
Hu Ge (director) (胡戈, born 1974), Chinese internet satirist
Hu Ge (artist/director), Chinese artist

See also
 Hu Ge (disambiguation)
 Hu (disambiguation)
 Ge (disambiguation)